Kobena Amed (born 10 November 1997) is an Ivorian footballer who currently plays for Omani side Al Taleiah.

Career statistics

Club

Notes

References

1997 births
Living people
Footballers from Abidjan
Ivorian footballers
Association football forwards
China League One players
Xinjiang Tianshan Leopard F.C. players
Ivorian expatriate footballers
Expatriate footballers in China
Ivorian expatriate sportspeople in China
Expatriate footballers in Oman
Ivorian expatriate sportspeople in Oman